The 2009 New Mexico Lobos football team represented the University of New Mexico in the 2009 NCAA Division I FBS college football season. The Lobos were led by first-year head coach Mike Locksley and played their home games at the University Stadium. The Lobos finished the season with a record 1–11 (1–7 MW).

Schedule

References

New Mexico
New Mexico Lobos football seasons
New Mexico Lobos football